Pacifica School District is a public school district in Pacifica, California, USA.  

Pacifica consists of one middle school, three K-8 elementary schools, two K-5 elementary schools, and the Linda Mar Educational Center. It currently serves over 3,100 students

Schools

Middle schools
 Lacy Middle School

Elementary Schools K-8
 Ocean Shore School
 Cabrillo School
 Vallemar School

Elementary Schools K-5
 Ortega Elementary School
 Sunset Ridge

Other
 Linda Mar Educational Center

References

External links
 
 Cabrillo School
 Otega School
Sunset Ridge School
 Ocean Shore School
 Vallemar School
 Ingrid B. Lacy Middle School
 Linda Mar Educational Center

School districts in San Mateo County, California